Nestor Landag Colonia (born February 16, 1992) is a flyweight weightlifter from the Philippines. He won the 2015 Asian Championships and placed third in the clean and jerk at the 2015 World and 2016 Asian Championships. He qualified for the 2016 Summer Olympics. He is coached by his uncle Gregorio Colonia, who competed at the 1988 Olympics.

Airman 2nd Class Colonia is also part of the Philippine Air Force weightlifting team, together with Hidilyn Diaz.

References

1992 births
Living people
Filipino male weightlifters
People from Zamboanga City
Sportspeople from Zamboanga City
Weightlifters at the 2010 Asian Games
Weightlifters at the 2014 Asian Games
Weightlifters at the 2018 Asian Games
Weightlifters at the 2016 Summer Olympics
Olympic weightlifters of the Philippines
Competitors at the 2017 Southeast Asian Games
Asian Games competitors for the Philippines
Southeast Asian Games bronze medalists for the Philippines
Competitors at the 2019 Southeast Asian Games
World Weightlifting Championships medalists
Competitors at the 2021 Southeast Asian Games
21st-century Filipino people